Stafford Browne (born 4 January 1972) is a former footballer who played as a striker. He made three Football League appearances for Brighton & Hove Albion.

Browne was born in Hastings and played football for various Sussex teams including Ringmer, Lewes, Horsham and Hastings Town. It was at Hastings where he ended the season top scorer and joining Brighton for the 1998–99 season and making three appearances.

After his spell at Brighton, Browne played for various Conference and Isthmian League sides, before dropping down to the Sussex County League to play for AFC Uckfield where the played as a center back.

References

External links 
 

1972 births
Living people
English footballers
Ringmer F.C. players
Hastings United F.C. players
Brighton & Hove Albion F.C. players
Welling United F.C. players
Yeovil Town F.C. players
Dagenham & Redbridge F.C. players
Aldershot Town F.C. players
Grays Athletic F.C. players
St Albans City F.C. players
Kingstonian F.C. players
Wivenhoe Town F.C. players
Worthing F.C. players
Heybridge Swifts F.C. players
A.F.C. Uckfield players
Association football forwards